Faking It or Fakin' It may refer to:
Faking It (British TV series)
Faking It (American TV series)
"Faking It" (song), a 2017 song and single by Calvin Harris featuring Kehlani and Lil Yachty
"Fakin' It" (Simon & Garfunkel song), 1967
"Fakin' It" (K. Michelle song), 2009
"Fakin' It" (Arrested Development), the fiftieth episode of the television show Arrested Development
Faking It: The Quest for Authenticity in Popular Music